Boffins (also referred to as The Boffins) is an Australian children's television programme produced by Film Australia in 1993. It was created by John Patterson and Ian Munro, who also co-created Johnson and Friends. The series was never broadcast or picked up by a network within Australia. The ABC initially wanted to show it as part of their schools programming, but this never happened for unknown reasons. The series did air internationally and was translated into several languages, and within Australia, it was later released on home video by the ABC in 1995.

Plot
Boffins follows the adventures of four tiny furry alien-like creatures known as Boffins, who spend their days in kitchen cupboards and surrounding areas, trying to discover the science behind how the world works, Madame Curie and Aristotle are very close to some of the answers, but Newton and Echo, the young boffins from the house next door are only interested in having fun!

The series was designed to introduce primary school children to some of the basic laws of science. Each episode explores a different concept; the transmission of sound, levers, pulleys, magnetism, gravity, siphons, evaporation, reflection and dispersion of light, friction, and requirements for growth.

Characters
 Aristotle: Appropriately named after the Greek philosopher, Aristotle loves science, but is quite lazy, conceited and bossy. However, he has a good heart and a great sense of humour. Aristotle despises Galileo, as he is jealous of his inventions. He lives in the kitchen cupboard with Madame Curie.
 Madame Curie: Madame Curie lives in the kitchen cupboard with Aristotle. Despite being strict at times, she is quite caring and acts as a motherly figure to Newton and Echo. She is named after polish physicist Marie Curie.
 Newton: Newton is a teenage boffin from the house next door, he has a dislike for science, matching the stereotype of people his age. He wears a red flat cap, and a yellow shirt featuring a peace symbol. Despite disliking science, he still visits the kitchen with Echo. He is, rather ironically, named after British physicist Sir Isaac Newton.
 Echo: Echo lives in the house next door with Newton. Compared to Newton, Echo is curious about science as opposed to directly disliking it. She wears a green shirt, with various symbols stitched onto it, and a skirt. She is named after the effect caused by the reflection of sound.
 Galileo: Galileo is Madame Curie's cousin, he lives in a kitchen cupboard in a house on the other side of town. He has invented various gadgets and machines which Aristotle is jealous of and he often sends them to Madame Curie, which infuriates Aristotle. Despite never physically appearing, he is frequently mentioned in various episodes. He is named after Italian physicist Galileo Galilei.
 Doris: Doris is Madame Curie's sister, who lives on the other side of town. She was only mentioned in the episode Wrong Number, in which she sends a letter to Madame Curie, prompting her to get a telephone. According to the letter, she lives with Galileo.

Cast

The costumes were built and designed by Studio Kite.

Episodes

International broadcasts
Despite being relatively obscure and never airing in Australia, Boffins was broadcast in various countries around the world - including Singapore, Malaysia, Israel, Brunei, Pakistan, Sri Lanka, Canada, The Middle East, Africa and possibly elsewhere. It was also translated and dubbed into Hebrew, Malay and Portuguese, among other languages.

The series was also released in the United States and Canada as a set of educational videos, which were only available to schools and universities.

Video releases
Three VHS tapes were released by ABC Video in 1995.

References

 - Boffins at the National Film and Sound Archive.
 - Boffins VHS tapes for educational use.

1994 Australian television series debuts
1994 Australian television series endings
Australian children's television series
Australian Broadcasting Corporation original programming
Australian television shows featuring puppetry
Science education television series
English-language television shows
Unaired television shows